Karim Mojtahedi (born 2 September 1930) is an Iranian philosophy professor at Tehran University. He has published over 20 books on philosophy. He was awarded UNESCO's Avicenna Prize for Ethics in Science at the 4th International Farabi Festival and received a plaque of honor from Iran's Cultural Luminaries Association.

Published works 
 Hegel's Thoughts
 Descartes and his philosophy
 Philosophy of history
 Kant's critical philosophy

See also 
Intellectual movements in Iran

References

External links
 University World News

People from Tabriz
University of Tehran alumni
Academic staff of the University of Tehran
1930 births
Living people
Philosophy academics
20th-century Iranian philosophers
21st-century Iranian philosophers
Philosophers of culture
Continental philosophers
Philosophers of history
Farabi International Award recipients
Iranian Science and Culture Hall of Fame recipients in Philosophy